The 1998 Pacific typhoon season was at the time the least active Pacific typhoon season on record, until the record was surpassed 12 years later, spawning 16 tropical storms and 8 typhoons. The scope of this article is limited to the Pacific Ocean, north of the equator and west of the international date line. Storms that form east of the date line and north of the equator are called hurricanes; see 1998 Pacific hurricane season. Tropical Storms formed in the entire west Pacific basin were assigned a name by the Joint Typhoon Warning Center. Tropical depressions in this basin have the "W" suffix added to their number. Tropical depressions that enter or form in the Philippine area of responsibility are assigned a name by the Philippine Atmospheric, Geophysical and Astronomical Services Administration or PAGASA. This can often result in the same storm having two names.

The 1998 season was very weak compared to the 1997 season; this was due to the strong El Niño in the previous season. During the 1998 season, a total of 28 tropical depressions developed across the western Pacific basin. Of those 28 depressions, a total of 18 strengthened into tropical storms of which 9 further intensified into typhoons. The first tropical cyclone developed on May 28, marking the fourth latest start to any Pacific typhoon season on record, and the last one dissipated on December 22. The Philippine region also set a record: with only eleven storms forming or moving into its area of responsibility, PAGASA had its quietest season on record, later tying with the 2010 season. Overall inactivity was caused by an unusually strong La Niña, which also fueled a hyperactive Atlantic hurricane season that year.

Systems

Tropical Depression 01W (Akang) 

The second tropical depression of the season developed out of a tropical disturbance which was first noted 1,080 km (670 mi) north-northwest of Palau on July 6. The disturbance gradually became better organized and was classified as Tropical Depression 01W at 1500 UTC on July 7. Upon becoming a depression, it marked the latest start for a Pacific typhoon season since reliable records began in 1959. The next day, 01W entered the Philippine Atmospheric, Geophysical and Astronomical Services Administration (PAGASA) area of responsibility and received the local name Akang. Slowly moving towards the northwest, the depression neared Taiwan. However, increasing vertical wind shear caused the convection associated with the depression to become displaced from the center of circulation. With the center exposed, 01W weakened. At 2100 UTC on July 10, the depression made landfall in northern Taiwan and dissipated shortly after. No known damage was caused by the depression.

Tropical Storm Nichole 

As 01W intensified over the Philippine Sea, a broad area of low pressure developed in the South China Sea. The low slowly intensified as it moved towards the north-northeast and was declared Tropical Depression 02W early on July 8. Tropical Depression 02W slowly strengthened as northerly outflow was constricted. By late on July 8, the depression was upgraded to a tropical storm and given the name Nichole. The storm reached its peak intensity while just offshore southern Taiwan with winds of 95 km/h (60 mph 1-minute winds) according to the Joint Typhoon Warning Center (JTWC) and 65 km/h (40 mph 10-minute winds) with a minimum pressure of 998 hPa (mbar) according to the Japan Meteorological Agency (JMA). The combination of dry air, strong wind shear, and the storm's proximity to land caused Nichole to quickly weaken to a tropical depression twelve hours after reaching its peak intensity. The exposed remnants of Nichole executed a clockwise-loop offshore Taiwan before traveling north into mainland China and dissipating. Rough seas produced by the storm caused four container ships to run aground in Taiwans' Kaohsiung Harbor, none of the crew members were injured. Heavy rains in Taiwan flooded an estimated  of crops.

Tropical Depression 03W 

Operationally considered to have only been a tropical depression, Tropical Storm 03W developed out of a tropical disturbance along the eastern edge of a monsoon gyre on July 22. Tracking in a gradual northwest to northeast curve, the disturbance gradually intensified and was classified as a tropical depression while located 790 km (490 mi) east-northeast of Iwo Jima on July 25. The depression briefly intensified into a tropical storm, with a peak intensity of 85 km/h (50 mph  1-minute winds) as convection wrapped around the entire center of circulation. However, strong wind shear quickly blew away the associated convection, causing 03W to weaken to a tropical depression. Early on July 26, 03W degenerated into an exposed low before dissipating.

Typhoon Otto (Bising) 

The first typhoon of the season developed out of a tropical low from a mesoscale disturbance in early August. Persistent convection developed around the low and early on August 2, the JTWC began issuing advisories on Tropical Depression 04W.

Storm signals were put in place in the Philippines prior to the storm's arrival on August 3. However, Otto turned away from the country and the signals were discontinued on August 5. Typhoon Otto produced heavy rains, amounting to at least 400 mm (15.7 in) in mountainous areas of Taiwan, caused flooding which killed five people. In all, damages in Taiwan amounted to NTD 25 million ($761,000 1998 USD). After traveling through the Taiwan Strait, the typhoon struck China, producing heavy rainfall which caused flooding in areas suffering from the worst flood in at least 45 years. Officials reported no damage or loss of life resulted from the storm in Fujian Province.

Severe Tropical Storm Penny (Klaring) 

A tropical disturbance formed on August 2 and strengthened into a tropical depression east of the Philippines. As Penny strengthened into a tropical storm, it made landfall over Northern Luzon, on August 7, and drifted into the South China sea on the same day. Strong vertical wind shear on August 8 caused Penny's convection to be displaced to south of the storm, and even exposed the level circulation center for a few hours. Penny was only located 165 kilometers from Hong Kong when it was at its closest distance to Hong Kong, and killed one person in Hong Kong. Penny soon made landfall over Maoming on August 11, and dissipated the next day.

Typhoon Rex (Deling) 

An active Tropical Upper Tropospheric Trough allowed for the development of Tropical Depression 6W on August 22, east of Luzon. It moved westward initially, but as the trough weakened a ridge to the east, it moved northeastward where it became a tropical storm on the 23rd. Rex slowly intensified to become a typhoon on the 26th, followed by reaching a peak of  winds on the 28th south of Japan. As it moved northward, it brought heavy flooding to Honshū, Japan, amounting to 13 deaths and moderate damage from mudslides across the island. Another trough pulled the storm eastward, saving Japan from a direct hit, and Rex continued northeastward to an unusually high latitude near 50°, when it became extratropical on the 9th near the Aleutian Islands, east of the International Date Line.

Tropical Depression 07W 

On August 26, a monsoonal trough formed over central China and drifted south. On August 29, the trough spawned an embedded low over Taiwan, and strengthened into a tropical depression on September 1. Tropical Depression 07W fully dissipated on September 6 due to vertical wind shear.

Severe Tropical Storm Stella 

In northern Japan, near Wakkanai, Hokkaidō, severe damage to many homes took place. One person in the region was killed after being blown off his roof while trying to repair it and twelve homes were destroyed. Several rivers overflowed their banks after rainfall exceeding  fell across Hokkaidō. Throughout Sōya Subprefecture, agricultural and fishing industry losses amounted to 23.1 million yen (US$171,213). Severe flooding took place in nearby Abashiri Subprefecture where hundreds of homes were inundated after rivers broke their banks. Over  of farmland was lost. Large sections of roadways were washed away, including 14 bridges. Total losses in Abashiri reached 25 million yen (US$185,296), much of which was due to fishing industry damage.

Severe damage was sustained in Iwamizawa, Hokkaidō after torrential rains triggered widespread flooding. One person was killed in the city and 29 buildings were destroyed. Agricultural losses in the area amounted to 14.9 million yen (US$110,436). Some of the worst floods were in Obihiro, where nearly 230 million yen (US$1.7 million) in agricultural losses was sustained. A third fatality from Stella took place in the area.

Tropical Depression 09W 

Tropical Depression 09W developed in the South China Sea on September 12. It moved westward and struck Hainan and Vietnam before dissipating on September 14.

Typhoon Todd (Emang) 

Seven people were killed by Todd in Kyushu. Damage in southern Japan amounted to 31.9 million yen (US$236,436).

Typhoon Vicki (Gading) 

Vicki developed in the South China Sea west of Luzon on September 17. Vicki moved east and crossed Luzon. After landfalling on Luzon, Vicki moved northeast and struck the Kii Peninsula in Japan on September 22 before becoming extratropical. The storm caused the deaths of 108 people.

Tropical Depression 12W 

Tropical Depression 12W developed in the South China Sea on September 16. It moved west-northwestward and moved along the coast of Vietnam. The depression made landfall in that country before dissipating on September 19.

Tropical Storm Waldo 

Tropical Storm Waldo developed on September 18. It moved northward and struck Japan before dissipating on September 21.

Typhoon Yanni (Heling) 

Yanni killed 50 people in South Korea.

Tropical Depression 15W 

Tropical Depression 15W developed in the South China Sea on October 2. It initially moved northeastward, before later curving northwestward. The depression made landfall in Vietnam shortly before dissipating on October 5.

Tropical Depression 16W 

Tropical Depression 16W developed near Taiwan on October 4. It lasted three days before dissipating on October 7.

Tropical Depression 17W 

Tropical Depression 17W developed near the Ryukuyu Island on October 5. It headed north-northeastward and dissipated on October 7.

Typhoon Zeb (Iliang) 

The monsoon trough near Guam developed a tropical depression on October 7. It moved westward, strengthening to a tropical storm on the 10th. The large inflow of the storm developed another tropical storm on the 10th; Tropical Storm Alex. The two moved westward, and as Zeb strengthened to a typhoon on the 11th, it absorbed the short-lived Tropical Storm Alex. It continued west-northwestward, rapidly intensifying to a  super typhoon on the 13th with an official minimum central pressure of 900 millibars and an unofficial minimum central pressure of 872 millibars, which would tie for the second lowest on record. Zeb maintained this intensity until hitting Luzon in the Philippines on the 14th. After weakening over the archipelago Zeb moved northward to hit Taiwan as a minimal typhoon on the 15th. It maintained this intensity until hitting Japan on the 17th, after which it became extratropical on the 18th. Zeb was responsible for 122 casualties in its path.

Tropical Storm Alex 

On October 10, a small area of low pressure developed within the outflow of Typhoon Zeb. The low maintained an area of deep convection and quickly strengthened into a tropical storm. Operationally, the system was not classified as a tropical storm until 0600 UTC on October 11. Zeb then brought stronger wind shear over Alex, ultimately absorbing the short lived Alex. Alex reached the intensity of tropical storm with sustained winds of 45 knots over 1 minute according to the Joint Typhoon Warning Center

Typhoon Babs (Loleng) 

A tropical disturbance in association with the TUTT (Tropical Upper Tropospheric Trough) formed into a tropical depression on October 11 near Guam. It moved westward under the influence of the Subtropical Ridge, and became a tropical storm on the 15th. Babs slowly intensified due to little upper level outflow, but when the outflow became more pronounced, it strengthened to a typhoon on the 19th and a super typhoon with a peak of  winds on the 20th. Babs hit the central Philippines as a Category 4, and flooded an area just hit by another super typhoon, Zeb, only 7 days before. Babs weakened over the islands, and turned north where upper level shear caused it to dissipate on the 27th. Super Typhoon Babs caused heavy mudslides in the Philippines, resulting in more than 300 deaths and heavy flooding.

Tropical Storm Chip 

Chip killed at least 17 people and caused VND 16.2 billion ($923,400 1998 USD) in Vietnam. The remnants of Chip regenerated into a tropical cyclone over the Bay of Bengal. Peaking as a strong Category 1 cyclone, it then was known as Cyclone 07B when its remnants cross Vietnam, Thailand, and Cambodia . The system made landfall in Bangladesh, killing 100 people.

Tropical Storm Dawn 

Though a weak tropical storm, torrential rains from Dawn triggered catastrophic flooding in Vietnam, killing at least 187 people. Regarded as the worst cyclone to hit the region in three decades, 500,000 homes flooded, an additional 7,000 were destroyed and an estimated 2 million people were left homeless. Damage was estimated at VND 400 billion (US$28 million).

Tropical Storm Elvis (Miding) 

Elvis killed 49 people and caused $30 million in damages in Vietnam.

Typhoon Faith (Norming) 

Tropical Storm Faith moved westward across the northwestern Pacific. It strengthened to a typhoon just as it crossed over the Philippines, an area hit by several typhoons this season. After reaching a peak of  winds over the South China Sea, Faith weakened to a tropical storm on December 14 just before making landfall on eastern Vietnam. It dissipated later that day.

In the Philippines, a total of eight people were killed and 17 others were reported as missing. Throughout the country, 51,785 people were displaced and another 20,419 were evacuated. Damages amounted to PHP 513.95 million (US$13 million). In Vietnam, 40 people were killed and three others were left missing. A total of 602 homes were destroyed, another 16,327 were damaged, and 58,487 ha of rice fields were inundated. Damages in the country amounted to VND 204 billion (US$15 million).

Tropical Storm Gil 

Tropical Storm Gil developed in the South China Sea on December 8. It moved westward and peaked with winds of 75 km/h (45 mph). Gil made landfall in Thailand as a tropical depression which caused a plane crash at Surat Thani due to bad weather before dissipating on December 13.

Tropical Depression 26W 

Tropical Depression 26W developed over the Philippines on December 17. It moved north-northwestward and dissipated near northern Luzon on December 19.

Tropical Depression 27W 

The final tropical depression of the season developed from a poorly organized tropical disturbance on December 18 over the South China Sea. Situated within an unfavorable environment, the system struggled to maintain deep convection; however, the following day, it was classified as Tropical Depression 27W by the JTWC. Operationally, 27W was regarded as a tropical storm, with maximum winds of 75 km/h (45 mph) but in post-season analysis, the intensity was lowered to 55 km/h (35 mph).

Storm names 

During the season 17 named tropical cyclones developed in the Western Pacific and were named by the Joint Typhoon Warning Center, when it was determined that they had become tropical storms. These names were contributed to a revised list which started on 1996.

Philippines 

The Philippine Atmospheric, Geophysical and Astronomical Services Administration uses its own naming scheme for tropical cyclones in their area of responsibility. PAGASA assigns names to tropical depressions that form within their area of responsibility and any tropical cyclone that might move into their area of responsibility. Should the list of names for a given year prove to be insufficient, names are taken from an auxiliary list, the first 10 of which are published each year before the season starts. This is the same list used for the 1994 season. PAGASA uses its own naming scheme that starts in the Filipino alphabet, with names of Filipino female names ending with "ng" (A, B, K, D, etc.). Because PAGASA started a new naming scheme in 2001, therefore, this naming list was not used in the 2002 season.

Season effects 
This table summarizes all the systems that developed within or moved into the North Pacific Ocean, to the west of the International Date Line during 1998. The tables also provide an overview of a systems intensity, duration, land areas affected and any deaths or damages associated with the system.

|-
| TD ||  || bgcolor=#| || bgcolor=#| || bgcolor=#| || Taiwan, Ryukyu Islands || None || None ||
|-
| 01W (Akang) ||  || bgcolor=#| || bgcolor=#| || bgcolor=#| || None ||  None || None ||
|-
| Nichole ||  || bgcolor=#| || bgcolor=#| || bgcolor=#| || Taiwan, China ||  None || None ||
|-
| TD ||  || bgcolor=#| || bgcolor=#| || bgcolor=#| || None ||  None || None ||
|-
| 03W ||  || bgcolor=#| || bgcolor=#| || bgcolor=#| || None ||  None || None ||
|-
| Otto (Bising) ||  || bgcolor=#| || bgcolor=#| || bgcolor=#| || Philippines, Taiwan, East China ||  ||  ||
|-
| Penny (Klaring) ||  || bgcolor=#| || bgcolor=#| || bgcolor=#| || Philippines, South China ||  None ||  ||
|-
| TD ||  || bgcolor=#| || bgcolor=#| || bgcolor=#| || None ||  None || None ||
|-
| Rex (Deling) ||  || bgcolor=#| || bgcolor=#| || bgcolor=#| || None ||  None || None ||
|-
| 07W ||  || bgcolor=#| || bgcolor=#| || bgcolor=#| || None ||  None || None ||
|-
| TD ||  || bgcolor=#| || bgcolor=#| || bgcolor=#| || None ||  None || None ||
|-
| Stella ||  || bgcolor=#| || bgcolor=#| || bgcolor=#| || Mariana Islands, Japan ||  ||  ||
|-
| 09W ||  || bgcolor=#| || bgcolor=#| || bgcolor=#| || South China, Vietnam ||  None || None ||
|-
| Todd (Emang) ||  || bgcolor=#| || bgcolor=#| || bgcolor=#| || Japan, East China ||  ||  ||
|-
| Vicki (Gading) ||  || bgcolor=#| || bgcolor=#| || bgcolor=#| || Philippines, Japan ||  ||  ||
|-
| 12W ||  || bgcolor=#| || bgcolor=#| || bgcolor=#| || Vietnam ||  None || None ||
|-
| Waldo ||  || bgcolor=#| || bgcolor=#| || bgcolor=#| || Japan ||  None || None ||
|-
| Yanni (Heling) ||  || bgcolor=#| || bgcolor=#| || bgcolor=#| || Taiwan, Ryukyu Islands, South Korea || Unknown ||  ||
|-
| 15W ||  || bgcolor=#| || bgcolor=#| || bgcolor=#| || South China, Vietnam ||  None || None ||
|-
| 16W ||  || bgcolor=#| || bgcolor=#| || bgcolor=#| || Taiwan, Ryukyu Islands ||  None || None ||
|-
| 17W ||  || bgcolor=#| || bgcolor=#| || bgcolor=#| || Ryukyu Islands ||  None || None ||
|-
| Zeb (Iliang) ||  || bgcolor=#| || bgcolor=#| || bgcolor=#| || Caroline Islands, Philippines, Japan ||  ||  ||
|-
| Alex ||  || bgcolor=#| || bgcolor=#| || bgcolor=#| || None ||  None || None ||
|-
| Babs (Loleng) ||  || bgcolor=#| || bgcolor=#| || bgcolor=#| || Caroline Islands, Philippines, China, Taiwan, Ryukyu Islands ||  ||  ||
|-
| TD ||  || bgcolor=#| || bgcolor=#| || bgcolor=#| || None ||  None || None ||
|-
| Chip ||  || bgcolor=#| || bgcolor=#| || bgcolor=#| || Vietnam ||  ||  ||
|-
| Dawn ||  || bgcolor=#| || bgcolor=#| || bgcolor=#| || Vietnam, Cambodia ||  ||  ||
|-
| 07B ||  || bgcolor=#| || bgcolor=#| || bgcolor=#| || Malay Peninsula ||  None || None ||
|-
| Elvis (Miding) ||  || bgcolor=#| || bgcolor=#| || bgcolor=#| || Philippines, Vietnam ||  ||  ||
|-
| Faith (Norming) ||  || bgcolor=#| || bgcolor=#| || bgcolor=#| || Caroline Islands, Philippines, Vietnam, Laos ||  ||  ||
|-
| Gil ||  || bgcolor=#| || bgcolor=#| || bgcolor=#| || Vietnam, Thailand ||  None || None ||
|-
| 26W ||  || bgcolor=#| || bgcolor=#| || bgcolor=#| || Philippines ||  None || None ||
|-
| 27W ||  || bgcolor=#| || bgcolor=#| || bgcolor=#| || None ||  None || None ||
|-

See also 

 1998 Pacific hurricane season
 1998 Atlantic hurricane season
 1998 North Indian Ocean cyclone season
 1998–99 Southern Hemisphere tropical cyclone season

References

External links 
 Japan Meteorological Agency
 Joint Typhoon Warning Center .
 China Meteorological Agency
 National Weather Service Guam
 Hong Kong Observatory
 Macau Meteorological Geophysical Services
 Korea Meteorological Agency
 Philippine Atmospheric, Geophysical and Astronomical Services Administration
 Taiwan Central Weather Bureau
 Satellite movie of 1998 Pacific typhoon season

 
Articles which contain graphical timelines